Macrocheilus lindemannae is a species of ground beetle in the subfamily Anthiinae. It was described by Jedlicka in 1963.

References

Anthiinae (beetle)
Beetles described in 1963